The Jiayuguan–Ceke railway  or Jiace railway is a railway in northwestern China between Jiayuguan in Gansu Province and Ceke, a border post in Ejin Banner of Inner Mongolia on the China-Mongolian border. It is the longest railway financed by an enterprise in China. The line connects the Lanzhou-Xinjiang and the Linhe-Ceke railway. Planning is under way for a  extension of the railway into Mongolia's Nariin Sukhait mining complex (Ovoot Tolgoi). In 2011 and 2012, the line carried, respectively, 1.21 and 1.17 million metric tons of coal.

Rail connections
 Jiayuguan: Lanzhou–Xinjiang railway, Jiajing railway
 Ceke: Linhe–Ceke railway, Ejin–Hami railway

See also

 List of railways in China
Rail transport in Inner Mongolia

References 

Railway lines in China
Rail transport in Gansu
Rail transport in Inner Mongolia